Legend: The Music of Jerry Goldsmith is a musical film score by American composer Jerry Goldsmith, released in 1986 for the worldwide release of the film of the same name, (excluding the US). The album was released on compact disc in 1992 through Silva Screen records and featured alternate cover art and additional songs.

Background
Goldsmith's score was featured in the original version of the film, but due to a disappointing test screening with the original orchestral score, director Ridley Scott decided to make changes to the film. Sidney Sheinberg, president of MCA (the parent company of Universal at the time), felt that the Goldsmith score would not appeal to the youth and pressed Scott for a new score. German group Tangerine Dream was contracted to complete a new, more contemporary score—-a job they completed in three weeks. Until 2002, only European audiences could see Legend with Goldsmith's score.

Track listing

References

External Links

 Jerry Goldsmith
 Tangerine Dream

1986 soundtrack albums
Fantasy film soundtracks
Jerry Goldsmith soundtracks
Silva Screen Records soundtracks
Adventure film soundtracks

it:Legend (colonna sonora)
nl:Legend (Jerry Goldsmith)